Karameşe is a village in the Sason District, Batman Province, Turkey. The village is populated by Kurds of the Timok tribe and had a population of 288 in 2021.

The hamlets of Bölücek and Ramazan are attached to the village.

References

Villages in Sason District
Kurdish settlements in Batman Province